Valerij is a given name. Notable people with the name include:

 Valerij Popov, Russian chess player. He was awarded the title Grandmaster by FIDE in 1999. Popov won the championship
 Valerij Zhuravliov, Soviet/Latvian chess master
 Valerij Verhušin, Macedonian wrestler

See also 
 Valērijs (given name)

 Valer (disambiguation)